Saddell is a small Scottish village situated on the east side of the Kintyre Peninsula of Argyll and Bute, overlooking the Kilbrannan Sound and the Isle of Arran,  from Campbeltown on the B842 road to Carradale. The name Saddell is derived from the Norse for sandy dale.

Saddell Abbey

Saddell is home to the ruins of a Cistercian Abbey. This was founded around 1160 by Somerled, and completed by his son, whose descendants became the Clan MacDonald and eventual Lords of the Isles. Stone carving was a speciality at Saddell and there are fine examples of carved medieval grave slabs displayed under cover in the grounds of the abbey, now a cemetery. Relief carvings on the stones show warriors in their armour, clerics, ships, huntsmen with stags, large swords and Celtic knotwork designs. Most were carved at Saddell Abbey but some are more typical of the Iona school of stone-carving.

Saddell Castle

Saddell Castle, a tower house  to the southeast and nearer the shore, was built for the Bishop of Argyll in the early 16th century. When the Campbells took it over in the late 17th century, stone from the abbey was used to add farm buildings to the castle. The family moved into a new house nearby around 1774, and the castle deteriorated over the years before being bought by the Landmark Trust. In 1976 the Landmark Trust contracted Mr Robert R Mauchline to restore the castle to its former glory. Soon after its completion the castle appeared in Paul McCartney's "Mull of Kintyre" music video. Mr Mauchline's daughters Joanna and Hazel were also featured in the video.

The Trust now owns both Saddell Castle and the newer Saddell House, and allows pedestrian access to the beach below at Saddell Bay.

Kildonan Dun

At the end of Saddell bay is Pluck Wood, and the remains of Kildonan Dun, a late Iron Age hillfort, dating from no earlier than 200BC, and made from Stone.

In contrast to the mostly round Duns, it has a D-shaped ground plan, like Barsalloch Fort and Castle Haven, in Galloway. The Dun measures about  within the outer two, one meter high and two meter thick ring wall. The impressive entrance with the well-recognizable door construction is located in the south-west. The double staircase on the rampart, located within the wall on the west side, and a round wall niche in the north east are intact. In form and design some novelties are shown, as occurred with Brochs in the same period.

The excavation of Dun Kildonan between 1936 and 1938 resulted in a precise chronology. Objects from the 1st and 2nd centuries demonstrate the time of construction of the dun, while objects from the 6th and 9th to 12th century or from later times show that the central square also remained an important focus. The finds are located in the Campbeltown Museum.

See also
 Dippen Bay
 Kildonald Bay
 Saddell Bay

References
Norman S. Newton, Kintyre (1999)
Saddell
Cistercian history

Villages in Kintyre
Landmark Trust properties in Scotland